Mo' Breau is an album by Canadian jazz guitarist Lenny Breau that was released in 1981.

History
Breau signed a three-album deal with Gene Rosenthal for Adelphi Records in 1977, the first of which was produced by Rosenthal and was released as Five O'Clock Bells. Subsequent recordings from these sessions were produced by Dan Doyle and resulted in Mo' Breau and Last Sessions.

Originally released on LP in 1981, it was reissued in 1987 on the Genes label and again reissued along with Five O'Clock Bells.

Reception

Track listing
"Ebony Queen/Pam's Pad" (McCoy Tyner / Lenny Breau) – 7:30
"Autumn Leaves" (Joseph Kosma, Johnny Mercer, Jacques Prévert) – 2:01
"...But Beautiful" (Jimmy Van Heusen, Johnny Burke) – 5:04
"Emily" (Johnny Mandel, Johnny Mercer) – 3:40
"New York City" (Breau) – 5:04
"I Remember Hank" (Breau) – 5:18
"Marlborough Street" (Breau) – 2:06
"Lone Pine" (Breau) – 4:02

Personnel
Lenny Breau – guitar, vocals

References

Lenny Breau albums
1981 albums
Adelphi Records albums